1 Timothy 5 is the fifth chapter of the First Epistle to Timothy  in the New Testament of the Christian Bible. The author has been traditionally identified as Paul the Apostle since as early as AD 180, although most modern scholars consider the letter pseudepigraphical, perhaps written as late as the first half of the second century AD.

This chapter deals with church organisation, especially in relation to widows and elders.

Text
The original text was written in Koine Greek. This chapter is divided into 25 verses.

Textual witnesses
Some early manuscripts containing the text of this chapter are:
Codex Sinaiticus (AD 330–360)
Codex Alexandrinus (400–440)
Codex Ephraemi Rescriptus (c. 450; extant verses 1–19)
Codex Freerianus (c. 450; extant verses 5–9, 16–19)
Codex Claromontanus (c. 550)

Old Testament references
 1 Timothy 5:18:

New Testament references
1 Timothy 5:18:

Verse 1
Do not rebuke an older man, but exhort him as a father, younger men as brothers,
The word presbuteros is used here and elsewhere in this chapter. In Greek, it is used both to designate old age and as the title of an office
in Judaism and Christianity. This usage can lead to some ambiguity, but in the first verse it is best regarded as concerning older men within the community.

"Real widows" and other widows (5:3–16)
The writer's advice regarding widows is more "detailed and precise" than the advice about other groups given elsewhere in the letter.

Verse 16
If any believing man or woman has widows, let them relieve them, and do not let the church be burdened, that it may relieve those who are really widows.

 "If any believing man or woman has widows": that is, if any member of a church have mothers, grandmothers or any near relatives who are widows, and incapable of taking care of themselves.

 "Let them relieve them and let not the church be charged": the members should take care of them out of their own substance; which is what Paul previously calls to show piety at home, and requit their own parents, so not burden the church with the maintenance of them.

 "Those who are really widows" (KJV: "that are widows indeed"): so the church may be in a better capacity, to supply the needs of the widows who have neither children nor any relatives to provide for them.

The rights of elders (5:17–19)

Verse 18
For the Scripture says,
"You shall not muzzle an ox while it treads out the grain,"
and,
"The laborer is worthy of his wages."
"You shall not muzzle an ox while it treads out the grain": citing verbatim .
"And remain in the same house, eating and drinking such things as they give, for the laborer is worthy of his wages. Do not go from house to house."

Verse 23
Stop drinking only water, and use a little wine because of your stomach and your frequent illnesses.
Whilst this verse appears to provide some personal advice for Timothy, biblical commentator Clare Drury suggests that "it may also be a roundabout way of attacking the asceticism of the writer's opponents".

See also
 Elder
 Presbyter
 Jesus Christ
 Related Bible parts: , Luke 10

References

Sources

External links
 King James Bible - Wikisource
English Translation with Parallel Latin Vulgate
Online Bible at GospelHall.org (ESV, KJV, Darby, American Standard Version, Bible in Basic English)
Multiple bible versions at Bible Gateway (NKJV, NIV, NRSV etc.)

05